Ravi Jangid (born 3 June 1987) is an Indian first-class cricketer who plays for Vidarbha.

References

External links
 

1987 births
Living people
Indian cricketers
Vidarbha cricketers
Cricketers from Rajasthan